A Second Look was a Canadian
television series which aired on CBC Television in 1969.

Premise
Terry David Mulligan and Bill Reiter hosted this satirical series which was based on BBC's The Frost Report. Commentary was combined with sketches as performed by comedians Allan Anderson, Graeme Campbell, Len Doncheff, Roxanne Erwin, Diane Grant, Mickie Maunsell and Graham Teear. Each episode concerned a particular theme, such as "Man and the Machine" on the debut.

Production
A Second Look was produced in Vancouver. It is distinct from CBC's earlier 1964 series A Second Look.

Scheduling
The half-hour series aired on Sundays at 2:00 p.m. (Eastern) from 5 January to 16 March 1969.

References

External links
 
 

CBC Television original programming
1969 Canadian television series debuts
1969 Canadian television series endings
Television shows filmed in Vancouver